Sibirtelecom, a former subsidiary of Svyazinvest Holding Company, is a regional telecommunications and Internet service provider in Siberia. It is responsible for providing service to over 29% of Russia's territory.

History
The company was formed by the legal union of many regional service providers. Please see the list of subsidiaries below.

Cable television companies of Russia
Svyazinvest
Companies based in Novosibirsk
Defunct companies of Russia
Companies formerly listed on the Moscow Exchange